Taeniotes leucogrammus is a species of beetle in the family Cerambycidae. It was described by James Thomson in 1865.

Subspecies
 Taeniotes leucogrammus luciae Touroult, 2007
 Taeniotes leucogrammus leucogrammus Thomson, 1865

References

leucogrammus
Beetles described in 1865